Arctic Circle Air was an American airline based in Fairbanks, Alaska, USA. It operated scheduled commuter services and charter flights to over 16 Alaskan communities. It was established and started operations in 1973. Its main base was Fairbanks International Airport.

Acquisition Merger
In October 2009 Arctic Circle Air was acquired by the parent company of Frontier Alaska. Arctic Circle Air was merged into the Era Alaska operation. Era Alaska is the renamed operation of Frontier Alaska now that it has been blended into the operating certificate of Era Aviation. In 2011 Arctic Circle Air's certificate was obtained by Marianas Harvests in Guam to provide service throughout the island areas of Guam, with no association with Era Alaska or Frontier Alaska.

Fleet 
2 Britten-Norman BN-2Ts
 Beech King Air
 Cessna 207
 Cessna 402 Utiliner
 Embraer Bandeirante
 Piper Lance
 Short C-23 Sherpa
 Short Skyvan
 Short 330

Destinations 
Arctic Circle Air operates services to the following domestic scheduled destinations (Ended as of November 2009).

 Allakaket (AET) - Allakaket Airport
 Anaktuvuk Pass (AKP) - Anaktuvuk Pass Airport
 Arctic Village (ARC) - Arctic Village Airport
 Bettles (BTT) - Bettles Airport
 Chalkyitsik (CIK) - Chalkyitsik Airport
 Eagle (EAA) - Eagle Airport
 Fairbanks (FAI) - Fairbanks International Airport
 Fort Yukon (FYU) - Fort Yukon Airport
 Galena (GAL) - Edward G. Pitka Sr. Airport
 Hughes (HUS) - Hughes Airport
 Huslia (HSL) - Huslia Airport
 Kaltag (KAL) - Kaltag Airport
 Nulato (NUL) - Nulato Airport
 Rampart (RMP) - Rampart Airport
 Tanana (TAL) - Ralph M. Calhoun Memorial Airport
 Venetie (VEE) - Venetie Airport

See also 
 List of defunct airlines of the United States

References

Airlines disestablished in 2010
Airlines established in 1973
Airlines based in Alaska
Defunct airlines of the United States
Companies based in Fairbanks, Alaska
1973 establishments in Alaska
2010 disestablishments in Alaska